Paralaubuca riveroi is a species of cyprinid fish from Southeast Asia.

Common names 
Plā pæb mæ̀n̂ả (literally; River Abramine)

Habitat 
They were found in freshwater.

Distribution 
Thus species is found in the Malay Peninsula as well as the Mekong, Mae Klong, and Chao Phraya basins.

Description
It grows to  standard length.

Utilization 
-

References

Paralaubuca
Cyprinid fish of Asia
Fish of the Mekong Basin
Fish of Cambodia
Fish of Laos
Fish of Thailand
Fish of Vietnam
Fish described in 1935
Taxa named by Henry Weed Fowler